Terminus is a Canadian black comedy short film, directed by Trevor Cawood and released in 2007. A meditation on urban isolation, the film stars Rob Carpenter as a man who is being followed around the city by a large humanoid creature made of concrete until being driven insane.

The film premiered at the 2007 Toronto International Film Festival.

The film was named to the Toronto International Film Festival's annual year-end Canada's Top Ten list for 2007, and won the Golden Sheaf Awards for Drama and Best of Festival at the 2008 Yorkton Film Festival.

References

External links

2007 films
2007 short films
2007 comedy films
Canadian comedy short films
Canadian black comedy films
2000s English-language films
2000s Canadian films